Gilberto Ribeiro de Carvalho, commonly known as Biro-Biro (born June 29, 1964) is a retired professional Brazilian footballer who played as a left back for several Campeonato Brasileiro Série A clubs.

Career
Born in Guarujá, São Paulo, Biro-Biro played for Bragantino from 1990 to 1992, winning the Placar's Campeonato Brasileiro Série A Bola de Prata award in 1990, and helping his club finish as Campeonato Brasileiro Série A runner-up in 1991. After playing for Sport in 1992 and in 1993, Palmeiras in 1994, playing two Copa Libertadores games, and Paysandu in 1994 and in 1995, when he played 25 Série A games, then he returned to Bragantino in 1996, where he played 15 more Campeonato Brasileiro Série A games. He eventually retired while playing for Sinop.

References

1964 births
Living people
Brazilian footballers
Clube Atlético Bragantino players
Sport Club do Recife players
Sociedade Esportiva Palmeiras players
Paysandu Sport Club players
Sinop Futebol Clube players
Association football fullbacks
Footballers from São Paulo (state)